Steve Sertich (born October 20, 1952) is an American ice hockey player. He competed in the men's tournament at the 1976 Winter Olympics.

References

1952 births
Living people
American men's ice hockey players
Olympic ice hockey players of the United States
Ice hockey players at the 1976 Winter Olympics
People from Virginia, Minnesota